The Directory of Open Access Journals (DOAJ) is a website that hosts a community-curated list of open access journals, maintained by Infrastructure Services for Open Access (IS4OA). It was launched in 2003 with 300 open access journals. The project defines open access journals as scientific and scholarly journals making all their content available for free, without delay or user-registration requirement, and meeting high quality standards, notably by exercising peer review or editorial quality control. DOAJ defines those as open access journals where an open license is used so that any user is allowed immediate free access to the works published in the journal and is permitted to read, download, copy, distribute, print, search, or link to the full texts of [the] articles, or use them for any other lawful purpose. The mission of DOAJ is to "increase the visibility, accessibility, reputation, usage and impact of quality, peer-reviewed, open access scholarly research journals globally, regardless of discipline, geography or language."

In 2015, DOAJ launched a reapplication process based on updated and expanded inclusion criteria. At the end of the process (December 2017), close to 5,000 journals, out of the 11,600 indexed in May 2016, had been removed from their database, in majority for failure to reapply. 

Notwithstanding the substantial cleanup, the number of journals included in DOAJ has continued to grow, to reach 14,299 as of 3 March 2020. As of December 2022, the independent database contains more than 18,650 open access journals and 8,265,272 articles covering all areas of science, technology, medicine, social sciences and the humanities.

DOAJ provides a change log on Google Sheets that has been updated since March 2014 and identifies the journals added and the journals removed with the justification for the removal.

Founder, Lars Bjørnshauge, announced his retirement in 2021 and from January 2022, DOAJ has a new Managing Director, Joanna Ball.

History

The Open Society Institute funded various open access related projects after the Budapest Open Access Initiative; the Directory was one of those projects. The idea for the DOAJ came out of discussions at the first Nordic Conference on Scholarly Communication in 2002. Lund University became the organization to set up and maintain the DOAJ. It continued to do so  until January 2013, when Infrastructure Services for Open Access (IS4OA) took over.

The Infrastructure Services for Open Access (IS4OA) C.I.C. was founded in 2012 in the UK as a community interest company by open access advocates Caroline Sutton and Alma Swan. It runs the DOAJ and, until 2017, the Open Citations Corpus.

In a 2015 comparison with MEDLINE, PubMed Central, EMBASE and SCOPUS, DOAJ resulted to have the highest number of open access journals listed, but less than a half of them had actively published contents on DOAJ.

There is a partnership DOAJ and OpenAIRE since October 2022.

See also 
 List of academic databases and search engines
 List of open-access journals
 Open Access Scholarly Publishers Association
 Free Journal Network
 Paperity - aggregator of open access journals

References

External links 
 

Open access (publishing)
 
Directories
Internet properties established in 2003
Lund University